Marek Hawełko (born 10 August 1959) is a Polish chess player who won the Polish Chess Championship in 1986. FIDE International Master (1984).

Chess career
In 1967 Marek Hawełko won Polish Junior Chess Championship in Bolesławiec. From 1974 to 1989 he played six times in the Polish Chess Championship's finals. He won gold (1986) and bronze (1987) medals. In Polish Team Chess Championships Hawełko won four medals: gold (1982), two silver (1979, 1980) and bronze (1981). In 1984 he won the international tournament in Rzeszów.

Marek Hawełko played for Poland in Chess Olympiads:
 In 1986, at fourth board in the 27th Chess Olympiad in Dubai (+7, =1, -3),
 In 1988, at third board in the 28th Chess Olympiad in Thessaloniki (+7, =2, -3).

References

External links
 
 
 

1959 births
Living people
Polish chess players
Chess International Masters
Chess Olympiad competitors